The  Kingharia are a Muslim community found in the state of Uttar Pradesh in India. They are also known as Panwariya.

Origin 

The Kingharia are a community of singers and Farmer. Their name is derived from the word kingri, which is a type of a violin. The word Kingharia literally means someone who plays the kingri. They claim to be Abbasi Shaikh and claim descent from Abbas, the uncle of Mohammad, the founder of Islam. The community is found mainly in Awadh, with concentrations in Lucknow, Bahraich, Barabanki and Gorakhpur. According to some traditions, they are a branch of the Abbasi community. They are further divided into seven clans, referred to as biradaris, which claim descent from a common ancestor. The seven clan include the Kingharia proper, the Bankhata, the Sewak, the Jogi, the Kapariya, the Atit and the Baanchhariya. Each of these clans is of equal status, and intermarry.

Present circumstances 

The Kingharia are a landless community. Their traditional occupation was singing of traditional folks songs. They would visit the home of wealthy Hindu and Muslims on special occasions such as a birth of a child. Many  of the community have abandoned their traditional occupation, and are now taking to cultivation. A larger number are agricultural labourers. The Kingharia are Sunni, although a few especially in Lucknow are Shia. They are strictly endogamous, and marry close kin. Their customs are similar to other Muslims in the Awadh region.

See also 
Mirasi

References 

Social groups of Uttar Pradesh
Muslim communities of Uttar Pradesh
Muslim communities of India
Shaikh clans